The Rachel Zoe Project is an American reality documentary series starring celebrity stylist Rachel Zoe. The series premiered on September 9, 2008 on the Bravo television network. The show also airs on Arena in Australia, Really in the United Kingdom, TV3 in Norway, Cosmopolitan TV in Canada, SIC Mulher in Portugal, Divinity channel in Spain, and Sub in Finland.

The show was confirmed by Bravo for a second season on December 5, 2008. Production began in January 2009. Zoe was spotted during Paris Fashion Week 2009, being followed by a TV crew filming footage for the show. Season 3 premiered on August 3, 2010 on Bravo. The third season covered the departure of Zoe's longtime styling associate, Taylor Jacobson, while introducing a new member to Team Zoe, Ashley Avignone. Season 4 premiered on September 6, 2011 on Bravo. Zoe confirmed that the series had been picked up for a fifth season in September 2012. The fifth season debuted on March 6, 2013. The show was cancelled in 2013.

Synopsis
The series follows the life of Rachel Zoe while she expands her business and attempts to balance her personal and professional life.

Cast

Main
 Rachel Zoe, celebrity fashion stylist, author, clothing designer and entrepreneur based in Los Angeles, California
 Rodger Berman, Rachel Zoe's husband and business manager
 Joey Maalouf, Zoe's hairdresser and best friend
 Brad Goreski (seasons 1–3), Zoe's associate and style director
 Taylor Jacobson (seasons 1–2), Zoe's styling associate
 Jeremiah Brent (season 4), Zoe's styling associate

Supporting
 Marisa Lee Runyon, Rachel's assistant
 Jordan (seasons 3–4), Zoe's styling associate
 Mandana Dayani (season 4), vice president of Rachel Zoe Inc.

Episodes

Season 1 (2008)

Season 2 (2009)

Season 3 (2010)

Season 4 (2011)

Season 5 (2013)

Home media release
Seasons 1-5 are currently available for purchase on Amazon.com.

References

External links
 

2000s American reality television series
2010s American reality television series
2008 American television series debuts
2013 American television series endings
English-language television shows
Bravo (American TV network) original programming
Fashion-themed television series